Alois Pravoslav Trojan (2 April 1815 – 9 February 1893) was a Czech lawyer and politician in Austria-Hungary. He was a member of the Imperial Council. He was active in the Revolutions of 1848 in the Austrian Empire, a politician of Old Czech Party, and later since 1880 leader of the Young Czech Party.

References

External links
 https://web.archive.org/web/20161115071741/http://euportal.parlamentnilisty.cz/ShowArticleMobile.aspx?id=11305
 http://svk7.svkkl.cz/arl-kl/cs/detail-kl_us_auth-p0202876-Trojan-Alois-Pravoslav-18151893/

1815 births
1893 deaths
People from Kladno District
People from the Kingdom of Bohemia
Old Czech Party politicians
Young Czech Party politicians
Members of the Imperial Diet (Austria)
Members of the Austrian House of Deputies (1861–1867)
Members of the Austrian House of Deputies (1867–1870)
Members of the Austrian House of Deputies (1871–1873)
Members of the Austrian House of Deputies (1873–1879)
Members of the Austrian House of Deputies (1879–1885)
Members of the Austrian House of Deputies (1885–1891)
Members of the Austrian House of Deputies (1891–1897)
Members of the Bohemian Diet
19th-century Czech lawyers